St. Wenceslas Church or St. Wenceslaus Church may refer to a number of different churches including:

In the Czech Republic
 St. Wenceslas Church (Vršovice) in Prague (District Prague 10), completed in 1930.
 St. Wenceslas Church (Zderaz) in New Town, Prague, first mentioned in 1115.

In the United States
 St. Wenceslaus Church, Chicago in Chicago, Illinois
 St. Wenceslaus Church, Baltimore in Baltimore, Maryland
 St. Wenceslaus Catholic Church and Parish House in Tabor, South Dakota
 St. Wenceslaus Church, Wisconsin in Waterloo, Wisconsin